Jurich is a surname. Notable people with the name include:

Jackie Jurich (born 1918), American boxer
Lynn Jurich (born c. 1979), American businesswoman
Tom Jurich (born 1956), American college sports administrator and footballer

See also
Jurich Carolina (born 1998), Curaçaoan footballer